Karukaputhur also spell as Karukaputhoor, is a place on the Pattambi taluk, Palakkad district of Kerala. This area part of the Thrithala legislative assembly and Thirumittacode Panchayath. It is a fast growing semi-urban centre in the eastern part of Palakkad district which is nearer to Thrissur town than Palakkad town.

Transportation 
Private buses are the main mode of mass transportation in Karukaputhur. Private bus operators ply their buses through this point to Pattambi and Nelluvay. The other major semi urban centers near Karukaputhur are Kootanad and Challissery. Karukaputhur is also the nodal point for transportation for Pattambi towards the North, Shoranur, Nelluvay towards the East, Peringode, Chalissery towards the West and the border villages of Trissur district. Its proximity to Trissur district is one of the important factors of this small towns booming growth in recent years.

Religious Centres 

Narasimhamurthy Temple

Karukaputhur Ekadasi festival is observed annually in Makaram month at the Karukaputhur Sree Narasimha Moorthy Temple. The shrine is located at Karukaputhur in Palakkad District. The temple is around 12 km from Pattambi. Karukaputhur Sree Narasimha Moorthy Temple Ekadasi 2018 date is January 28.This ancient shrine is dedicated to the Narasimha Avatar of Vishnu.The Ekadasi is observed on the Shukla Paksha Ekadasi day in Makaram month.

Special rituals are observed on the day in this ancient shrine. The temple is decorated traditionally with flowers, leaves, coconut fronds, banana leaves and plantain. The ekadasi is observed after the Amavasya in Makaram month. (Shukla Paksha Ekadasi in Makaram month).

 Karukaputhur Juma Masjid

The famous Karukaputhur Nercha is observed during February of every year. This is also called Karukaputhur Odambulli Jaram Chandanakudam Nercha. This is one of the oldest nercha festivals that occur in Kerala and is of almost 120 years old.

Major Institutions

Educational 

 GHSS Chathanur
 GLPS Chathanur
 AUPS Chazhiyattiri
 GLPS Akilanam
 GLPS Pallippadam
 IG English Medium School
 MES Karukaputhur
 Jaya College Chathanur
 Masters Study Centre Chathanur
 Oxygen Chathannur

Financial 

 Punjab National Bank - Thirumittacode Branch
 Federal Bank - Karukaputhur Branch
 Muthoot Finance - Karukaputhur

Notable Personalities 

 E Sreedharan - Metro man
 Kalamandalam Chandran
 Kalamandalam Geethanandan
 Peringode Vijayan
 Vijayan Chathannur
 Achuthanandan V Peringode

References

Villages in Palakkad district